Tamil Nadu Pollution Control Board is the governing body to monitor and control air, noise, and water pollution in the state of Tamil Nadu.

External links 
TNPCB - Official Website

State agencies of Tamil Nadu
State pollution control boards of India
Government agencies established in 1982
Environment of Tamil Nadu
1982 establishments in Tamil Nadu